William Patrick Daley (March 7, 1925 – January 16, 2022) was an American ceramist and professor, known for large scale, contemporary, unglazed stoneware.

Biography 
Daley was born on March 7, 1925, in Hastings-on-Hudson, New York. He attended Massachusetts College of Art and Design and graduated with a bachelor's degree in 1950, and Teachers College, Columbia University and graduated with a degree in 1952. He initially taught at state schools in Iowa and New York. Daley taught ceramics from 1957 until 1990 at University of the Arts, Philadelphia.

He received a gold medal in 2003 from the American Craft Council.

Daley’s work is in various public collections including at the Metropolitan Museum of Art, Museum of Art and Design, Museum of Fine Arts, Houston, Philadelphia Museum of Art, among others.

He died in Elkins Park, Pennsylvania, on January 16, 2022, at the age of 96.

See also 
 Craft in America

References 

1925 births
2022 deaths
American ceramists
Teachers College, Columbia University alumni
Massachusetts College of Art and Design alumni
People from Hastings-on-Hudson, New York
University of the Arts (Philadelphia) faculty
Artists from New York (state)